The Birmingham and Staffordshire Gas Light Company operated in Birmingham and Staffordshire from 1825 to 1875.

History

In 1825, the Birmingham and Staffordshire Gas Light Company was founded by act of parliament to manufacture and supply gas to Birmingham and a number of surrounding towns, including West Bromwich; the lighting of the main road through the town was also mentioned in the Act.

The Swan Village Gas Works were the first part of the complex to be constructed, and when completed in 1829 were the largest in the country.

In 1874, the Mayor of Birmingham, Joseph Chamberlain, lead the Council to buy out the company. An Act of Parliament was obtained in July 1875 and the Birmingham Corporation Gas Committee was set up.

References

1825 establishments in England
Energy companies established in 1825
Energy companies disestablished in 1875
Organisations based in Birmingham, West Midlands
Utilities of the United Kingdom
Defunct oil and gas companies of the United Kingdom
History of Birmingham, West Midlands
Industrial history of England
British companies established in 1825
British companies disestablished in 1875